Corymbia bella, commonly known as the ghost gum, weeping ghost gum, or the paper-fruited bloodwood, is a species of tree that is endemic to northern Australia. It has smooth, powdery, white to pale grey bark, lance-shaped adult leaves, flower buds in groups of three, creamy white flowers and cup-shaped, barrel-shaped or urn-shaped fruit.

Description
It has smooth, powdery, white to pale grey bark that is shed in thin scales, occasionally with a small amount of thin, rough bark at the base. The branchlets are smooth and lack oil glands in the pith. Flowering occurs between September and January and the flowers are creamy white. The capsules are present on the tree in most months.

Taxonomy and naming
The specific epithet (bella) is from the Latin word bellus meaning "beautiful", referring to the tree as a whole.

Distribution and habitat
The range of C. bella extends from the Kimberley region of Western Australia across the Northern Territory and northern part of Queensland. It is common in monsoonal areas as far west as Broome and then along the Mitchell Plateau through to Kununurra and Derby. It is then spread across the top end of the Northern Territory from Top Springs to Pine Creek north to Darwin and spreading around the Gulf of Carpentaria. It is then found east from the border from Doomadgee to Cloncurry and Croydon and in the south west of the Cape York Peninsula as far as the lower part of the Mitchell River.

The tree prefers alluvial soils along low lying seasonally wet areas such as flood plains where it comprises part of the woodlands found in these locations. It is also commonly found along creek levees and the edge of swamps and lakes amongst melaleucas and also makes up part of savanah woodland at low point of the plains.

Response to fire
The tree is able form seeds after about 11 years. Following fire it will have an epicormic response and resprout shortly afterward. If the fire scorches all of the leaves the trees have a mortality rate of less than 30%.

Use in horticulture
The tree is easily cultivated from seed and grows well in colder climates despite its origins. It is adaptable to most dry or moist well-drained soils in a sunny position and is regarded as hardy, drought and frost tolerant. Although seed can be planted at most times of the year in Australia it is best sown in spring or autumn in temperate climates.

See also
 List of Corymbia species

References

bella
Myrtales of Australia
Flora of Western Australia
Flora of the Northern Territory
Flora of Queensland
Plants described in 1995